Voyage of the Acolyte is the first studio album by English guitarist, songwriter, and singer Steve Hackett, released in October 1975 on Charisma Records as his only album recorded and released while he was a member of Genesis. Hackett recorded the album during a break in group activity in mid-1975 and used guest musicians, including Genesis bassist Mike Rutherford and drummer Phil Collins, to play on the record. It has a loose concept with the title and lyrics of each track inspired by a Tarot card.

Voyage of the Acolyte reached No. 26 in the UK and No. 191 in the US. It was reissued in 2005 with bonus tracks. A surround upmix of the album is included in Premonitions: The Charisma Recordings 1975–1983  (2015).

Background and writing
By 1975, Hackett had been the guitarist in the progressive rock band Genesis for four years. He began to write sections of different songs while recording albums with Genesis, specifically at moments when his "services weren't really called upon, and I found I had a lot of spare time". By this time, Hackett had become increasingly frustrated with the band's packed touring schedule, which had affected his creativity, and had a growing desire to work with a new set of musicians. He had written pieces without any specific project in mind, including those for instruments other than the guitar and another for a female vocalist, but after a while of this he had assembled enough ideas to form an album. Development was put on hold in late 1974 due to Genesis touring commitments with their album The Lamb Lies Down on Broadway (1974), but Hackett remained productive and continued to write in his hotel room each night which kept him "sane" and help calm his stage nerves.

When it came to a direction of the album, Hackett thought of a loose concept from his newfound interest in Tarot cards, which he used to title the album's tracks, and their lyrics, based on various cards in a deck. He took the cards that had conjured the strongest feeling and "mapped out a way of working", such as having "Star of Sirius" a "poppy" track to reflect the optimism that the corresponding Tarot card depicts. A track left off the album was one named "The Fool", which had Hackett play in a style similar to that of Pete Townshend to a song that was like "ELO meets The Who", but he chose not to use it. Some of Hackett's material originated from his pre-Genesis days. Hackett had convinced Genesis to rehearse "Shadow of the Hierophant" as a potential song for Foxtrot, but it fell through. It also marked a first collaboration with his brother John on an album, which has continued through Steve Hackett's solo career. The album also signified Hackett's first attempts at playing keyboards, and aimed for an album that had a more layered sound.

The album's original title was Premonitions, but management at Charisma disliked it and suggested Voyage of the Acolyte, to which Hackett agreed.

Recording
Hackett recorded Voyage of the Acolyte in June and July 1975, starting one month after Genesis had finished touring their double concept album, The Lamb Lies Down on Broadway. Recording was completed in four weeks at Kingsway Recorders, then located in Kingsway, central London.

The album's cover is a Chinese watercolour painting by Brazilian artist Kim Poor, whom Hackett later married and who produced many of his subsequent album covers. Hackett dedicated Voyage of the Acolyte to Poor.

Track listing
All songs written by Steve Hackett, except where indicated.

Personnel 
Credits are adapted from the album's original liner notes.

Musicians
 Steve Hackett – acoustic & electric guitar, Mellotron, harmonium, autoharp, bells, effects, vocals (5) 
 John Acock – acoustic piano, Elka Rhasphody synthesizer, Mellotron, harmonium
 John Hackett – ARP synthesizer, bells, flute
 Mike Rutherford – fuzz 12-string guitar, bass guitar, bass pedals
 Johnny Gustafson – bass guitar (6)
 Percy Jones – additional bass guitar (3)
 Phil Collins – drums, percussion, vibraphone, vocals (6)
 Robin Miller – oboe (4, 5), English horn (6)
 Nigel Warren-Green – cello (5)
 Sally Oldfield – vocals (8)

Production
 Steve Hackett – producer, arrangements
 John Acock – producer, engineer
 Rob Broglia – assistant engineer
 Paul Watkins – assistant engineer
 Louie Austin – assistant engineer (8)
 Tex Read – equipment
 Geoff Banks – equipment
 Steve Baker – equipment
 Tony Smith – organization
 Alex Sim – organization
 Kim Poor – cover artwork
 Philip Lloyd-Smee – CD design
 Barry Plummer – photography

References

1975 debut albums
Charisma Records albums
Chrysalis Records albums
Steve Hackett albums